VisionCivil is a solution of calculations and designs that helps engineers and land surveyors of Canada. Programmers have developed the civil engineering software in order to facilitate terrain modeling from different angles; triangulation mode, producing profiles, sections cross plans, capping, pipe services, and also to make rapid and accurate volume calculations for land surveyors and civil engineers.

Initially released in late 1992 VisionCivil was one of the first vertical computer-aided design programs. VisionCivil ran on primitive entities, as the technology evolved VisionCivil followed. In 1996, from a simple design tool it acquired graphic interface and C programming. The drafting features associated with COGO calculations and digital terrain modeling capacities brought VisionCivil to the new era.

VisionCivil, developed by Geo-Plus, is a pioneer for Canada’s geomatics industry and is widely use for it has thousands of licenses in circulation.

VisionCivil runs on AutoCAD, MicroStation, PowerDraft and BricsCAD environments.

Education
VisionCivil and VisionPlus are used in some technical design colleges in Canada as a teaching tool for geomatics.

Version history

External links

Computer-aided design software